Associazione Sportiva Roma did not have its best season, dropping into the lower half of the league, and only saving its Serie A status by a few points. New coach Carlos Bianchi failed to get the most out of a prolific squad, and was sacked in the middle of the season, with club advisor Nils Liedholm taking over at the helm for the rest of the championship.

Players

Transfers

Winter

Competitions

Overall

Last updated: 1 June 1997

Serie A

League table

Results summary

Results by round

Matches

Coppa Italia

UEFA Cup

First round

Second round

Statistics

Players statistics

Goalscorers
  Abel Balbo 17 (5)
  Francesco Totti 5
  Marco Delvecchio 4
  Daniel Fonseca 4

References

A.S. Roma seasons
Roma